Norika Sefa is a Kosovan film director, writer and editor, living in Prague, Czech Republic. Her feature film debut, Looking for Venera (2021), won a special jury award at the 50th International Film Festival Rotterdam.

Life and work
She holds a master's degree from the FAMU Prague. In her films, she often merges fiction and documentary. Norika has been invited to join the European Film Academy.

Desde Arriba (2020) is a hybrid documentary made under the guidance of Werner Herzog in the Peruvian jungle.

Looking for Venera 
Looking for Venera (Albanian: Në kërkim të Venerës) (2021) is Sefa's debut feature film. The film is a coming-of-age drama shot in Kosovo with an ensemble composed of mostly non-actors. She wanted to show a picture of Kosovo far from exotic stereotypes.

The film is a Kosovo Cinematography Center and Macedonia co-production. The film was shot in a small town in Kosovo, at the border with Macedonia. The film premiered at 50th International Film Festival Rotterdam, winning a special jury award in the Tiger competition. Norika is currently developing her next feature film set in Kosovo.

Filmography 
 Ingredients (2014) – short
 Cheers (2015) – short
 Flutter (2016) – short doc
 Desde Arriba (2020)
 Kiss Me, Now (2020) – short doc
 Në kërkim të Venerës/Looking for Venera (2021) – feature film

References

External links 

Albanian film directors
Kosovan film directors
People from Gjakova
Living people
Year of birth missing (living people)
Kosovan women film directors
Albanian women film directors